Untitled is a 1998 painting by Ellen Gallagher. It is in the collection of the National Galleries of Scotland in Edinburgh.

The painting is one of many in a series that Gallagher produced consisting of large scale, black paintings that she used to explore her African-American heritage and early stereotypes of African Americans, including minstrel shows. To create Untitled, Gallagher glued paper to a canvas. She used black oil paint on the paper and on top of that, silver paint to create small, human lips in rows.

The piece was acquired by the National Galleries and Scotland in 2008 with money from the Anthony d'Offay Donation and the National Heritage Memorial Fund.

See also
Untitled, a 1999 painting in the same series by Gallagher, in the Art Institute of Chicago

References

1998 paintings
Paintings in the National Galleries of Scotland
Paintings by Ellen Gallagher